Thomas P. Revelle (1868–1941) was a Seattle lawyer and politician who was a proponent for the founding of the city's Pike Place Market. Revelle was born in Maryland but moved to Seattle in 1898 to serve as a minister at a local Methodist church. He studied law at the University of Washington and became a member of the bar. He ran for City Council and served from 1906 to 1911. In 1910 he ran for Congress but lost the election. He served as a United States Attorney for the Western district of Washington. In this capacity Revelle prosecuted and convicted the former Seattle Police official turned bootlegger Roy Olmstead during Prohibition.

References

External links
 http://www.historylink.org/index.cfm?DisplayPage=output.cfm&File_Id=1949

Politicians from Seattle
History of Seattle
United States Attorneys for the Western District of Washington
1868 births
1941 deaths
Lawyers from Seattle